Konstantinos Koumas (Larissa, 26 September 1777 - Trieste, 13 May 1836) was a Greek 'Teacher of the Nation', a pioneer of the Modern Greek Enlightenment, a historian, philosopher and translator of literary works.

Biography

Childhood and studies 

He was born in Larissa in 1777. His father was Michael Koumas, a fury merchant.

From the fear not to be taken by the Janissaries, he spent his childhood hidden in at home, without ever attending school or church. In 1787, because of the plague epidemic that broke out in Larissa, the family of Koumas left in Tyrnavos. There, little Konstantinos learned how to read the synaxaries at church and the Salvation of Sinners by Landos (Αμαρτωλών Σωτηρία του Λάνδου). Because he developed an enthusiasm for knowledge, his parents delivered him at fifteen at the school of Tyrnavos, where he had Ioannis Pezaros (Ιωάννης Πέζαρος) as his teacher. He was educated by him for six years and he got the reputation of a prominent student. He was taught of Ancient Greek classical writers and basic principles of philosophy jointly with mathematics, geometry and physics, in which he showed special inclination. Metropolitan of Larissa, Dionysis Kaliarchis took him with him in Constantinople and introduced him to the Grand Dragoman of the Sublime Porte, Constantine Ypsilantis. When Constantine was declared Prince of Wallachia, he suggested hiring him at his services, but Koumas refused and returned back to his homeland, where he became a teacher.

Teacher at Tsaritsani and Ampelakia 

Because of the constant terrorism of the Turkish, he fled to Tsaritsani where he taught and preached from a pulpit. He taught Greek and scientific studies in simple Greek language by the standards of the democrats and he introduces algebra as a new lesson. In October of 1798, he’s marrying the daughter of his teacher, Ioannis Pezaros.

He then went to Ampelakia, where Gregory Konstantas and the doctor Spyridon Asanis from Kefallonia used to teach. In 1799, Koumas is having a daughter but he loses his wife. Deeply saddened, he fled to the Vineyards, where he occupied with Asanis in translating the work of a French astronomer and mathematician Abbe de la Caille, about conical prefectures.

In Vienna 

At the end of 1803, Anthimos Gazis took him with him when he visited at summer, his birthplace. And Koumas wanted passionately to meet “the Enlightened Europe”. At the capital of Austria - Hungary, where he was the chaplain of a prosperous Greek community, he was included in his staff for the publication of his Greek dictionary. Also, Koumas was appointed as a private teacher to the wealthy merchant Stephanos Moschos (Στέφανος Μόσχος), while at the same time he applied to the University, mainly attending math related courses. With the still intense echo of the French Revolution, Vienna at the time is full of liberty and new ideas, it’s a center of spiritual and artistic movement, already having a university since 1365, while books, newspapers and magazines are being distributed in several languages. He himself is learning German. 1807 was a rough year for Koumas, finding him in a formidable financial situation, after his father’s death.

In Smyrna 

In 1808 he received an invitation from the Greeks of Smyrna to take over the management of the newly established Philological Gymnasium of Smyrna. At the urging of Adamantios Korais, who appreciated him for his abilities, he accepted and went there. In this position he taught mathematics, philosophy, experimental physics, geography and ethics, while he organized physical and chemical experiments by equipping the school with the corresponding instruments. With his teaching he introduced rationalism and experimentation, displacing the ecclesiastical tradition of teaching based on memorization and obedience. He gained great reputation as a worthy organizer of schools, and the Patriarch Cyril VII invited him to Constantinople to run the Great School of the Nation. In 1814 he accepted the post of director of the Kourotsesmeio school in Xirokrini (north of Constantinople), where he remained for only one year and returned to Smyrna, where in 1815 his daughter was getting married.

Stance towards the Filiki Etaireia 

Koumas was forced to become a member of the Filiki Etaireia, but he was skeptical, if not negative, about the Revolution and the Friends. In his work "Stories of human actions ..." (1832) he describes many friends as moneylenders, who catechized new members because they paid a florin for each new member. He criticizes the Friends because they predicted the certain fall of the Ottoman Empire. He described Alexandros Ypsilantis as "naive and childish". However, this negative attitude towards the Friendly Society was widespread among scholars before the Revolution.

In Germany 

In October 1817 the Greek scholar went to Vienna to publish books and to enrich his knowledge. He travels to German universities and meets great contemporary scholars, such as Wolf, Krug, Delling, Kreuzer. He admires the rational spirit of Immanuel Kant. The University of Leipzig awarded him a doctorate in Philosophy and Fine Arts, sending him the corresponding diploma in early 1820, while the Royal Academy in Berlin and the University of Munich, recognized him as an honorary member. After this two-year wandering, which was particularly useful for his intellectual training, he will return back to Smyrna, having in his armory a rich translation and publishing work.

Return to Smyrna 

The school of Smyrna, however, in 1819 was closed and Koymas refuses the proposal for the management of the Evangelical School. During his stay there he deals with the translation of a Greco-German dictionary (some "Reimeros"), considering German as the language of devotion to science and rationalism. This work is forced to stop with the declaration of the Greek Revolution. His entire property, including his remarkable library, is confiscated by the Turkish who consider him suspicious.

Greek Revolution and escape to Austria 
He escapes on an Austrian ship to Trieste. From there he will go to Vienna where he is arrested by the Austrian police of Metternich on charges of participating in a conspiracy, but is quickly released on restrictive terms. In Vienna he completes the compilation of his dictionary - his only work that he managed to save - and then he will proceed to his publication, while immediately afterwards he will deal with the writing of the History of Human Acts from ancient times until 1831. This work, which he published in the same year in 12 volumes, is his most important intellectual creation. In the period up to 1836, Koumas refused twice to assume duties related to educational activities in Greece due to his fragile health. During his last years he spent in Tergeste/Trieste where he died in 1836 of cholera at the age of 59. His stance on the language issue/His attitude towards language issue Koumas remained over time "the most loyal and consistent follower of Korais", an opponent of the archaic word/ancient Greek language , whom he considers as a brake on the enlightenment effort for the progress of Greek-speaking education. Koumas believed in the social character of education and considered that teaching in a more familiar language contributes decisively to the achievement of this goal. For these reasons he came into conflict with representatives of the archaic language/ ancient Greek language such as Neophytos Doukas.

Pension 
From there they arrived after six days of horse riding in the panspermon of Adria in the city of Trieste. In it I met the most knowledgeable, hard-working, for the sake of our generation and respected man from Thessalia, Koyma. It happened there by chance, while I was coming down to Greece after the son of Sophocles and the wise Economos during that (April-day) (1834) of my stay in Trieste. The well-educated Koymas was then writing the general geography and, as usual, he was working thoroughly from morning. Until the fourth hour of the afternoon and, meaning, he went out regularly for a walk.When we did not meet him, he expressed his desire to watch him as long as he wanted to stay in Trieste, because he had some relationship with none other than the expatriates in that city.On the first Sunday of my stay in Trieste, I attended the venerable Koyma in the Greek Orthodox Church, which was also attended by the wise Economos.

- Panagiotis Papanaoum, Autobiography, 1873.

His work 
The list of his works is presented in his book Polychronis Enepekidis, Korais-Koymas-Kalvos, Athens 1967, pp. 165-166.

 Elementary series of mathematical and physical treatises, volumes 8, Vienna 1807.
 Chemistry summary, volumes 2, Vienna 1808.
 Synopsis of Physics, Vienna 1812.
 Dissertation in the category of one of the Duke of Argos ", Hermes the Wise, 18, (1813).
 Veilandou Agathon, volumes 3, Vienna 1814.
 Historical chronology, Vienna 1818.
 Synopsis of the History of Philosophy, Vienna 1818.
 Constitution of Philosophy, volumes 4, Vienna 1818-1820.
 "Pedagogy. On education and schools ", Hermes the Wise (1819) Summary of Sciences for the pioneers containing Arithmetic, Geometry, New Geography, Astronomy, Logic and Ethics, Vienna 1819.
 Summary of Old Geography, Vienna 1819.
 Dictionary for them studying the ancient Greek books, according to Reimeros's Greek-German, volumes 2, Vienna 1826.
 History of human deeds from ancient times to the present day, volumes 12, Vienna 1830-1832.
 Grammar for schools, Vienna 1833.
 Geography, volumes 5, Vienna 1838-1840.
 The two Apologies to the Great Church of the eloquent K. Economos and other letters of his unpublished, Ermoupolis Psyros 1861.

References

Sources 
Μεγάλοι διδάσκαλοι του γένους - Ημερολόγιον Εγκυκλοπαιδικόν. 1913. σελίδες 99–101. Ανακτήθηκε στις 30 Ιουλίου 2011

Bibliography 

 Ρωξάνη Δ. Αργυροπούλου, «Ο K. M. Κούμας ως φιλόσοφος» επιλεγόμενα της έκδοσης του Κέντρου Ερεύνης της Ελληνικής Φιλοσοφίας της Ακαδημίας Αθηνών (Σειρά Β᾽: Επανεκδόσεις), W. G. Tennemann, Σύνοψις της ιστορίας της φιλοσοφίας, μετάφρασις Κ. M. Κούμα, Αθήνα 1973, 225-243 [=Προσεγγίσεις της νεοελληνικής φιλοσοφίας, Θεσσαλονίκη, Βάνιας, 2004, 78-100].
 Ρωξάνη Δ. Αργυροπούλου,«Γλώσσα και πραγματικότητα στον Κ. Κούμα», Ελληνική Φιλοσοφική Εταιρεία, Πρακτικά Συμποσίου Γλώσσα και πραγματικότητα στην ελληνική φιλοσοφία, Αθήνα, 1985, 270-274 [=Προσεγγίσεις της νεοελληνικής φιλοσοφίας, Θεσσαλονίκη, Βάνιας, 2004, 101-107].
 Ρωξάνη Δ. Αργυροπούλου, «Η Ηθική του Κ. Μ. Κούμας και το Σύστημα τη πρακτικής φιλοσοφίας του W. T. Krug», Φιλοσοφία 7 (1977), 224- 230 [=Νεοελληνικός ηθικός και πολιτικός στοχασμός. Από τον Διαφωτισμό στον Ρομαντισμό, Θεσσαλονίκη, Βάνιας, 2003, 152-170].
 Ρωξάνη Δ. Αργυροπούλου, «Το πρότυπο του Αγάθωνα στη διανόηση του Κ. Μ. Κούμα», Φιλοσοφία 23-24 (1993-1994 ), 455-467 [=Νεοελληνικός ηθικός και πολιτικός στοχασμός. Από τον Διαφωτισμό στον Ρομαντισμό, Θεσσαλονίκη, Βάνιας, 2003, 171-180].
 Ρωξάνη Δ. Αργυροπούλου,«Η ελευθερία στην αναζήτηση της αρετής κατά τον Κ. Μ. Κούμα» στον συλλογικό τόμο Ρ. Αργυροπούλου-A. Κουκής-Κ. Πέτσιος-A. Κελεσίδου-Α. Γλυκοφρύδη-Λεοντσίνη, Η έννοια της ελευθερίας στον Νεοελληνικό Στοχασμό, πρόλογος Ε. Μουτσόπουλος, ημίτομος δεύτερος, δέκατος ένατος αιών, Ακαδημία Αθηνών, Κέντρον Ερεύνης της Ελληνικής Φιλοσοφίας, Αθήναι 1997,11-31.
 Ρωξάνη Δ. Αργυροπούλου, «Η πορεία της θεοσέβειας από τον Κ. Μ. Κούμα στον Θ. Καΐρη», Κέντρον Νεοελληνικών Ερευνών Ε.Ι.Ε., Πρακτικά Πανελληνίου Συμποσίου Θεόφιλος Καΐρης, Αθήνα, 207-210 [=Νεοελληνικός ηθικός και πολιτικός στοχασμός. Από τον Διαφωτισμό στον Ρομαντισμό, Θεσσαλονίκη, Βάνιας, 2003, 190-196].
 Ψημμένος Νίκος, «Η φυσική και τα μαθηματικά στη θεώρηση του Κ. Μ. Κούμα». Στο: Πρακτικά του συνεδρίου «Οι φυσικές επιστήμες στην Ελλάδα και ιδιαίτερα στη Θεσσαλονίκη πριν την Επανάσταση» (Λάρισσα – Αμπελάκια – Τύρναβος 22-23.3.1985), Λάρισα 1986, 72-79
 Ψημμένος Νίκος, «Ο Κωνσταντίνος Κούμας ως ιστορικός της νεοελληνικής φιλοσοφίας», Φιλοσοφία 15-16 (1985-86), 376-397.
 Ζεγκίνης, Ιωάννης: «Κωνσταντίνος Κούμας, ένας διδάσκαλος του Γένους». Παρνασσός 22 (1980), 227-231.
 Καράς, Γ.: Θεόφιλος Καΐρης, Κωνσταντίνος Μ. Κούμας. Δύο πρωτοπόροι δάσκαλοι του γένους, Αθ. 1977.
 Τσιρίκογλου-Λαγούδα, Φωτεινή: Ο Θεσσαλός λόγιος-παιδαγωγός του νεοελληνικού διαφωτισμού Κωνσταντίνος Μ. Κούμας. Η ζωή, το έργο του, οι ιδέες του. «Αφοί Κυριακίδη», Θεσσαλονίκη 1997.

1777 births
1836 deaths
People from Larissa
18th-century Greek educators
19th-century Greek educators
Greek expatriates in Austria
19th-century Greek writers
Members of the Filiki Eteria
People of the Modern Greek Enlightenment